Robert Bryson Templeton (29 March 1880 – 2 November 1919) was a Scottish football player and manager. He played as an outside right for Aston Villa, Newcastle United, Woolwich Arsenal, Celtic, Kilmarnock and Fulham.

He represented the Scotland eleven times between 1902 and 1913. His first international would have been on 5 April 1902, but the match was declared void after 26 spectators died during the first Ibrox disaster.

References

External links

1880 births
1919 deaths
Footballers from South Ayrshire
Association football outside forwards
Scottish footballers
Scotland international footballers
Aston Villa F.C. players
Newcastle United F.C. players
Arsenal F.C. players
Celtic F.C. players
Kilmarnock F.C. players
Fulham F.C. players
Scottish Football League players
English Football League players
Scottish Football League representative players
Scottish Junior Football Association players
Scotland junior international footballers